The 2012 season for  began in January at the Tour Down Under and ended in October at the Tour of Beijing. As a UCI ProTeam, they were automatically invited and obliged to send a squad to every event in the UCI World Tour. The team took a total of 47 victories in the season with the most notable being Bradley Wiggins' overall victory in the Tour de France. Wiggins (2), Mark Cavendish (3) and Chris Froome also took stage victories in the event, with Froome finishing second to Wiggins in the overall standings.

2012 roster
At the end of the 2011 season Kurt Asle Arvesen, Kjell Carlström and Dario Cioni retired. Following the disbanding of the cycling team HTC–Highroad Sky signed four riders from the team including World Road Race Champion Mark Cavendish, Danny Pate, Kanstantsin Sivtsov and Bernhard Eisel.

Ages as of 1 January 2012.

Riders who joined the team for the 2012 season

Riders who left the team during or after the 2011 season

One-day races

Spring classics
Despite being sick en route during the Kuurne–Brussels–Kuurne Mark Cavendish won his first race for Sky.

Autumn races

Stage races
Mark Cavendish made his debut for the team at the Tour of Qatar; during the race he won his first stages for Sky as he took the third and fifth stage. Cavendish won a stage in the Tirreno–Adriatico.
Cavendish won the overall title at the Ster ZLM Toer, his first general classification win. At the Tour of Britain Cavendish won stages three, four and eight and held the lead of the race. Luke Rowe additionally won the first stage for the team as Cavendish crashed.

Grand Tours

Giro d'Italia

Mark Cavendish and Rigoberto Urán were seen as Sky's sprint and GC leaders at the Giro. They were joined by Uran's fellow Colombian Sergio Henao, who made his Grand Tour debut in the event, Bernhard Eisel, Juan Antonio Flecha, Ian Stannard, Jeremy Hunt, Geraint Thomas and Peter Kennaugh, the latter two using the event as preparation for the Olympic Team Pursuit. The race began in Herning, Denmark with an 8.7 km individual time trial, in which Thomas finished second behind Taylor Phinney. The following stage saw a sprint finish in the same city, with Cavendish taking has first grand tour stage victory for Sky, and his 8th in the Giro. Cavendish was in contention for victory on the following stage but in the sprint Roberto Ferrari aggressively switched lanes, clipping Cavendish and sending him to the ground and causing the whole field to stack up behind. Among other riders to fall was overall leader Phinney. Cavendish later tweeted that Ferrari should be "ashamed to take out Pink, Red & World Champ jerseys". Cavendish was lucky to suffer only minor injuries, and recovered sufficiently on the following rest day to start Stage 4, a team time trial, where Sky recorded the ninth fastest time, 30 seconds down on the winners, Garmin. Despite his injuries, Cavendish took his second victory on Stage 5. The next stages were more hilly, and Uran rose to tenth place overall on Stage 10. Cavendish took his third stage win of the event on Stage 13 to extend his lead in the Points Classification. Stage 14 was the first categorised mountain stage of the race, and Uran took sixth place to rise to seventh place on the GC, and take the lead in the Young Rider's Classification. On the following stage however, Henao proved the stronger of the two Colombians, finishing fourth and taking the White Jersey from his teammate. On Stage 17, Uran finished fourth with the same time as winner Joaquim Rodríguez, and rose to fifth overall, re-claiming the white jersey from Henao, who now sat in 10th overall. Cavendish was beaten by Andrea Guardini in the sprint finish on Stage 18, but extended his Points Classification lead over Rodriguez to 29 points. On Stage 20, the queen stage of the race, finishing on the Stelvio Pass, Uran struggled on the final climb and was paced by Henao, with the pair dropping over a minute to Rodriguez and Ryder Hesjedal. The final Stage was a 28.2 km individual time trial in Milan. Geraint Thomas took second place behind Marco Pinotti on the stage, with Uran and Henao finishing seventh and ninth overall, 5 minutes 57 seconds and 7 minutes 50 seconds behind the winner, Ryder Hesjedal, respectively. Uran won the White Jersey, the first victory for Sky in a Grand Tour classification. Meanwhile, Rodriguez edged out Cavendish to win the Points Classification by a single point.

Tour de France

Bradley Wiggins led Sky at the Tour de France, and was considered the favourite for overall by victory by many, following his victories in Paris–Nice, the Tour de Romandie and the Critérium du Dauphiné. He would be supported in the mountains by Chris Froome, Michael Rogers, Richie Porte, Konstantin Sivtsov, Christian Knees and Edvald Boasson Hagen, whilst World Champion Mark Cavendish and Bernhard Eisel were also selected to challenge in the sprints. The race got off to an ideal start for Sky and Wiggins, as he finished second to Fabian Cancellara in the Prologue, meaning he took time out of all his GC rivals, without the team having to defend the Yellow Jersey from the start. Boasson Hagen also placed fifth in the Prologue. On Stage 1, Boasson Hagen finished third after bridging across to a late attack by Cancellara and Peter Sagan, only for Sagan to outsprint the pair. Chris Froome meanwhile suffered a flat tyre in the closing stages and lost over a minute to Sagan. Stage 2 saw the first bunch sprint of the race, and Cavendish took a thrilling victory, edging out André Greipel, despite the lack of a lead out train. Stage 3 saw a hill top finish in Boulogne-sur-Mer, and Boasson Hagen finished second to Sagan. The team lost Sivtsov on the stage however, as he crashed out with a broken leg. Cavendish looked to be in contention for another sprint victory on Stage 4, but he and Eisel were taken out in a crash inside the last 3 km. The pair were lucky to sustain only minor injuries, and started the following Stage, where Cavendish placed fifth. Sky were avoided disaster on Stage 6, with most of the team not being caught up in a crash which delayed most of the field, although Cavendish and Boasson Hagen lost time. The crash effectively removed Fränk Schleck, Alejandro Valverde, Pierre Rolland, and the entire Rabobank and Garmin teams from contention for overall victory.

Stage 7 saw the first summit finish of the Tour, on La Planche des Belles Filles. After Boasson Hagen, Rogers and Porte successively drove a hard tempo on the climb, only Cadel Evans, Vincenzo Nibali and Rein Taaramäe remained with Wiggins and Froome on the climb. Froome outsprinted Evans to take victory on the Stage, whilst Wiggins came in third to take the race lead. Stage 9 was a 41.5 km individual time trial, which Wiggins won by 35 seconds over Froome, who came second. Wiggins now led the race by 1 minute, 53 seconds over Evans, with Froome now sitting third overall a further 14 seconds back, ahead of Nibali in fourth. On Stage 10, Nibali attacked on a descent with help from teammate Sagan, but was brought back by the efforts of Sky, and in particular Porte.

The second summit finish of the race came on Stage 11, to La Toussuire. On the stage, Evans and teammate Tejay van Garderen attempted a long range attack on the Col de la Croix de Fer, but could not gain a lead of more than 30 seconds over the Sky led peloton, before being brought back by Rogers. As the peloton reached the final climb, Nibali and Jurgen Van Den Broeck launched several attacks, the second of which Froome was forced to work hard to bring back, and appeared to be in difficulty at one stage, leaving Wiggins to set the pace, although Froome recovered. The pair rejoined Nibali and Jurgen Van Den Broeck, only for Froome to immediately attack, putting Wiggins in difficulty. He subsequently received the order from his team manager to hold back and wait for yellow jersey Wiggins, and the group remained together for the rest of the climb, with the exception of Evans who cracked and lost time, meaning Froome moved up to second overall, two minutes and five seconds behind Wiggins.

Boasson Hagen took third on Stage 13 after a surprising lead out by Wiggins. During stage 14, a mountain stage, a spectator threw carpet tacks onto the narrow road at the top of the Mur de Péguère climb.[156] Several riders suffered punctures, including Evans, who lost approximately two minutes while his team repaired his bicycle. Wiggins and his fellow members of Team Sky emerged without a puncture. Believing that a puncture resulting from an unfortunate incident should not determine the fate of a competitor, Wiggins then had his teammates and the rest of the peloton slow down to allow Evans and other affected cyclists to catch up. Once they had done so, the peloton remained together for the rest of the race, resulting in little change to the general classification. It was perceived as a generous act of sportsmanship and Wiggins was called "Le Gentleman" as a result. On Stage 16, Wiggins and Froome were the only riders able to respond to an attack by Nibali on the final climb, and the three stayed together on the descent to finish with the same time. On the final summit finish on Stage 19, Wiggins and Froome dropped all of their rivals and attempted to catch Valverde, who was out in front. Ultimately, they came up short due to Froome having to wait three times for Wiggins as the race leader was several metres behind his domestique on certain parts of the climb, although they took second and third to extend their advantage over Nibali. Sky made a late call to chase down the day's breakaway on Stage 18, in the hope of giving Cavendish a stage victory to repay his work as a domestique. However, a late attack by Luis León Sánchez and Nicolas Roche looked set to be the winning move, only for Cavendish to sprint past the pair in the final 200 metres to take his second stage win of the race.

The penultimate stage of the Tour was the final individual time trial into city of Chartres. Wiggins and Froome repeated the 1-2 of the Stage 9 time trial, all but sealing their 1st and 2nd places overall. The Tour concluded with the now-customary stage finish on the Champs-Élysées in Paris, where Sky chased down a late breakaway before Wiggins and Boasson Hagen led out Cavendish, winning the final stage for the fourth successive year, becoming the first incumbent world champion to win on the Champs-Élysées. His 23rd stage victory[109] allowed him to move into fourth place on the all-time Tour stage wins list. Wiggins finished safely alongside Rogers to secure his overall victory, becoming the first British rider to win the event, and the first person in history to win the Paris–Nice, the Tour de Romandie, the Critérium du Dauphiné and the Tour de France in a single season. He was joined on the podium by Froome, who finished second overall, and Nibali in third.

Vuelta a España
Juan Antonio Flecha, Chris Froome, Sergio Henao, Danny Pate, Richie Porte, Ian Stannard, Ben Swift, Rigoberto Urán and Xabier Zandio lined up to start the Vuelta a España. Froome was designated the team leader, while Swift was the squads sprinter. Sky finished fifth in the time trial on the first stage. Ben Swift finished in second place on stage 18 and third on the second stage.  Chris Froome finished second on stage six. Richie Porte finished second on stage 20.

Season victories

Footnotes

References

External links

2012 road cycling season by team
Ineos Grenadiers
2012 in British sport